The position of Mayor of Kingston upon Hull, Yorkshire, England was established in 1332, being established by Edward III; the first mayor being William de la Pole.

26 June 1914 it was declared that the Chief Magistrate and Officer of the City would bear the style and title of Lord Mayor due to "the city's high position in the roll of ports of [the] kingdom".  The honour was confirmed to non-metropolitan district by letters patent dated 18 March 1975.

Mayors of Kingston-upon-Hull

Unless otherwise stated, the following  list is from the Hull History Centre.

Edward III

Richard II

Henry IV

Henry V

Henry VI

Edward IV

Richard III
 1483 Thomas Phillips
 1484 Richard Burdon

Henry VII

Henry VIII

Edward VI

Phillip and Mary

Elizabeth I

James I

Charles I

Commonwealth

Charles II

James II

William and Mary

Anne

George I

George II

George III

George IV

William IV

Victoria

Edward VII

George V

Lord Mayors of Kingston-upon-Hull
Unless stated, the following  list is from the Hull History Centre.

George V

Edward VIII
 1936 Frederick Holmes

George VI

Elizabeth II

See also
 List of sheriffs of Kingston upon Hull
 List of stewards of Kingston upon Hull

Notes

References

Sources
 
 
 

Kingston upon Hull
Mayors